The Øresund Metro is a proposed metro link between the cities of  Copenhagen, Denmark, and Malmö, Sweden. It would complement the current Øresund heavy rail line.

Background
In September 2011, the local governments in Copenhagen and the neighbouring Malmö in Sweden announced that they were seeking European Union funding to study a potential metro line under the Øresund to the neighbourhood of Malmö Central Station, providing faster trips and additional capacity beyond that of the existing Øresund Bridge. The study, for which the EU granted funding in the following December, will consider both a simple shuttle between the two stations and a continuous line integrated with the local transport networks on each side, and they anticipate a travel time of app. 20 minutes between the two city centers.  Work on the study was completed in April 2021.

In May 2018 the Oresundsmetro Executive was announced, formed of representatives from the two cities, industry and researchers, to explore the proposal to link Copenhagen and Malmö via a driverless metro system, with travel time of around 20 minutes compared to 35 minutes by train. Capacity constraints are expected on the Oresund Line rail services once the Fehmarn Belt Fixed Link is completed, and the €4 billion metro proposal would ease this bottleneck.

Proposal

See also
 Øresundståg
 Johor Bahru–Singapore Rapid Transit System - a similar cross-border metro line currently under construction between Singapore and Malaysia

References

External links
 Official website: oresundsmetro.com/en

Rapid transit in Denmark
Rapid transit in Sweden
Railway lines in Denmark
Railway lines in Sweden
International railway lines
Rail transport in the Capital Region of Denmark
Rail transport in Malmö
Proposed rapid transit
Cross-border rapid transit